The Central District of Sarvabad County is a district (bakhsh) in Sarvabad County, Kurdistan Province, Iran. At the 2006 census, its population was 43,492, in 10,281 families.  The District has one city: Sarvabad. The District has six rural districts (dehestan): Bisaran Rural District, Dezli Rural District, Kusalan Rural District, Paygelan Rural District, Razab Rural District, and Zherizhah Rural District.

References 

Sarvabad County
Districts of Kurdistan Province